The Schmidt sting pain index is a pain scale rating the relative pain caused by different hymenopteran stings. It is mainly the work of Justin O. Schmidt, a former entomologist at the Carl Hayden Bee Research Center in Arizona. Schmidt published a number of works on the subject, and claimed to have been stung by the majority of stinging Hymenoptera.

His original paper in 1983 was a way to systematize and compare the hemolytic properties of insect venoms. A table contained in the paper included a column that rated sting pain, starting from 0 for stings that are completely ineffective against humans, progressing through 2, a familiar pain such as that caused by a common bee or wasp sting, and finishing at 4 for the most painful stings; in the original paper, only the bullet ant, Paraponera clavata, was given a rating of 4. Later revised versions of the index added Synoeca septentrionalis, along with tarantula hawks as the only species to share this ranking. Descriptions of the most painful examples were given, e.g.: "Paraponera clavata stings induced immediate, excruciating pain and numbness to pencil-point pressure, as well as trembling in the form of a totally uncontrollable urge to shake the affected part."

Schmidt repeatedly refined his scale, including a paper published in 1990, which classifies the stings of 78 species and 41 genera of Hymenoptera, and culminating in a book published in 2016.

An entry in The Straight Dope reported that "implausibly exact numbers" which do not appear in any of Schmidt’s published scientific papers were "wheedled out of him" by Outside magazine for an article it published in 1996.

In September 2015, Schmidt was co-awarded the Ig Nobel Physiology and Entomology prize with Michael Smith for their Hymenoptera research.

Overview 
Schmidt's pain scale of Hymenopteran stings is organized into levels, ranging between 1 and 4, with 4 being the most painful. However, insect stings that feel very different can be put into the same level. Thus, later versions of the scale always include a brief description of his experience being stung by each type of insect.

Pain Level 1 
Some of the insect stings Schmidt considered to be at a pain level of 1 include the Southern fire ant, the graceful twig ant, the Western paper wasp, the urban digger bee, and most small bees. The duration of the pain of insect stings categorized into Pain Level 1 generally is five minutes or less.

Since many small bees are categorized into a pain level of 1, most toxic polypeptides in bee venom are melittin, apamin, and MCD peptide. Melittin is the main toxin of bee venom, and it damages red blood cells and white blood cells. Apamin is a neurotoxin that augments polysynaptic reflexes. MCD peptide destroys mast cells.

Feeling only slight pain, Schmidt described the sting of an urban digger bee, categorized into Pain Level 1, as "almost pleasant, a lover just bit your earlobe a little too hard." Also rated into Pain Level 1, Schmidt has described the sting of a sweat bee as "light, ephemeral, almost fruity. A tiny spark has singed a single hair on your arm."

Pain Level 2 
Schmidt set the sting of the Western honey bee at a pain level of 2 to be the anchoring value, basing his categorization of all other stings on it. He has categorized a variety of wasps, bees, and ants into Pain Level 2, including yellowjackets, the Asiatic honey bee, the trap-jaw ant, and the bald-faced hornet. The duration of the pain of the stings in this level is generally between five and ten minutes long. Schmidt categorized the majority of Hymenopteran stings as having a pain level of 2.

The sting of a termite-raiding ant, categorized as a pain level of 2, has a similar feeling as "the debilitating pain of a migraine contained in the tip of your finger," according to Schmidt. On the contrary, a yellowjacket's sting was described as being "hot and smoky, almost irreverent. Imagine W. C. Fields extinguishing a cigar on your tongue."

Pain Level 3 
Most insects that are characterized as having a pain level of 3 are wasps, including the neotropical red paper wasp, the red-headed paper wasp, and Klug's velvet ant (a wingless wasp and not a true ant). The duration of the sting pain can range anywhere from one minute (such as the sting of the red paper wasp) to half an hour (such as the sting of the velvet ant). Wasp venom uniquely contains kinin. One of the kinins found in wasp venom, "polistes kinin 3", is found to lead to similar effects on smooth musculature and circulation as bradykinin.

Some ants are also rated at a Pain Level 3, including the giant bull ant and the Maricopa harvester ant. Schmidt considered the sting of the Maricopa harvester ant as having a pain level of 3, describing it as such: "After eight unrelenting hours of drilling into that ingrown toenail, you find the drill wedged into the toe."

Pain Level 4 
Pain Level 4 is the highest level in the Schmidt sting pain index. Schmidt's original index rated only one such example, the sting of the bullet ant, as a 4. Schmidt described the sting as "pure, intense, brilliant pain...like walking over flaming charcoal with a three-inch nail embedded in your heel." The bullet ant's venom primarily contains poneratoxin, a paralyzing neurotoxic peptide.

Schmidt later gave the sting of a tarantula hawk species, Pepsis grossa, a rating of a 4, which he described as "blinding, fierce [and] shockingly electric", though the duration of pain from the sting is short-lived, lasting only approximately five minutes. The composition of tarantula hawk venom is unknown.

Schmidt also later rated the sting of a species of warrior wasp as a 4, describing it as "Torture. You are chained in the flow of an active volcano. Why did I start this list?", saying the pain lasts up to two hours.

Evolution from painful to toxic stings 
The Schmidt sting pain index arose from the pursuit of a larger hypothesis: that the evolution of sociality in Hymenoptera was dependent on the evolution of venom that was both painful and toxic. Pain is an advertisement of damage in the body, but molecules that produce pain and those that are toxic, and actively cause damage, are not the same. Although the painful signal acts as a deterrent, intelligent predators learn the dishonesty of this signal with repeated exposure – that there is no real damage being done. For the early Hymenoptera that were primarily solitary, the pain alone would allow them the chance to escape. Furthermore, solitary insects do not provide a high energy reward for predators, and therefore predators do not expend significant effort to hunt them. However, with the evolution of sociality where many Hymenoptera cluster together in colonies, nests become a nutritionally rich and therefore worthwhile target. If there were no defences, predators would devour the defenceless society, leaving few surviving individuals. Sociality would therefore not be beneficial. In order for sociality to evolve, Hymenoptera needed a defence beyond a painful sting to protect their whole colony. Their sting was an advertisement of damage, and toxicity evolved as its truth. With a toxic sting, and thus the ability to protect against predators, Hymenoptera were able to progress towards sociality and its associated evolutionary benefits of the shared raising of youth, individual task specialization, inter-colony communication, and food storage.

To approach studying this evolutionary connection between toxicity and sociality, Schmidt recognised there needed to be a quantitative measure with which to score the painfulness of stings. Assays for toxicity are already well characterized and can be quantified, but without the Schmidt sting pain index, there would be no way to relate the amount of sociality to the level of pain, and therefore this hypothesis could not have been studied.

See also 
 Dol scale to measure pain
 Starr sting pain scale by Christopher Starr, based on the Schmidt index
 Kings of Pain, a TV series with another pain index

References

Further reading 
 Berenbaum, May. "A Stinging Commentary", in American Entomologist, (Summer 2003).
 Conniff, Richard. "The King of Sting", in Outside, v. 21 n. 4 (April 1996), pp. 82–84, 147.
 Conniff, Richard. "Stung: How tiny little insects get us to do exactly as they wish", Discover, June 2003.

External links 
 The Chemical Compositions of Insect Venoms - Includes the graphic below
 A Partial Schmidt Insect Sting Pain Index

Insect bites and stings
Pain scales
1983 introductions